Olearia argophylla, commonly known as musk daisy-bush, native musk or silver shrub, is a species of flowering plant in the family Asteraceae and is endemic to south-eastern Australia. It is a shrub or tree with silvery branchlets, egg-shaped to elliptic leaves, and white and yellow, daisy-like inflorescences.

Description
Its branchlets are densely covered with fine, silvery or pale brown hairs pressed against the surface. The upper surface of the leaves is glabrous and the lower surface covered with minute, woolly, white or silvery hairs.

Taxonomy 
Musk daisy-bush was first formally described in 1806 by Jacques Labillardière who gave it the name Aster argophyllus in his book Novae Hollandiae Plantarum Specimen. In 1867, George Bentham changed the name to Olearia argophylla in Flora Australiensis.

In 1825, Henri Cassini changed Labillardière's name Aster argophyllus to Eurybia argophylla in Frédéric Cuvier's Dictionnaire des Sciences Naturelles but this name is considered a synonym by the Australian Plant Census.

Distribution and habitat 
Olearia argophylla commonly grows on cool moist sheltered slopes and in fern gullies in taller eucalypt forests south from the Whian Whian State Conservation Area in eastern New South Wales, the Australian Capital Territory, through most of eastern Victoria apart from the Grampians to Tasmania where it is common and widespread.

Use in horticulture 
Olearia argophylla can be propagated from seed or from cuttings. It prefers partial to full shade and is frost tolerant but prefers partial to full shade in soils that are neutral or slightly acidic.

References

argophylla
Asterales of Australia
Flora of New South Wales
Flora of the Australian Capital Territory
Flora of Tasmania
Flora of Victoria (Australia)
Plants described in 1806
Taxa named by Jacques Labillardière